Vecherniy Murmansk (Russian: "Вечерний Мурманск" ~ The Evening Murmansk) is an evening newspaper published in Murmansk, Russia. It was founded on January 2, 1991.

External links
Vecherniy Murmansk

Newspapers published in the Soviet Union
Publications established in 1991
Russian-language newspapers published in Russia
Murmansk Oblast
Murmansk
1991 establishments in Russia